Kiuu is a settlement in Kenya's Central Province. It's in Nyeri County, Mukurwe-ini constituency, Rutune Location, Mutundu Sub-location.

It's populated entirely by Kikuyu Ethnic Tribe.

With rural-urban migration, Kiuu have experienced a negative growth rate (relative to that of Mukurwe-ini Constituency at 0.8%).
There are fewer children in classrooms as compared to 20 years ago. 
Even with improved water, road and electricity connectivity, the population continues to reduce

References 
David Mwai Macharia, a native of Kiuu

Populated places in Central Province (Kenya)